The Democratic Social Christian Party is a political party in Democratic Republic of the Congo. It is headed by former Mobutu-era prime minister André Bo-Boliko Lokonga, and was co-founded by Lokonga and Joseph Ileo in 1990.

In the 2006 general elections the party gained two seats in the National Assembly.  In the 19 January 2007 Senate elections, the party won one of 108 seats.

It is a member of the Centrist Democrat International organization.

1990 establishments in Zaire
Christian democratic parties in Africa
Federalism in the Democratic Republic of the Congo
Federalist parties
Political parties established in 1990
Political parties in the Democratic Republic of the Congo